Marcăuţi may refer to:

Marcăuţi, Briceni, a commune in Moldova
Marcăuţi, Dubăsari, a commune in Moldova